Samaheej ( Samāhīj) is a village in Bahrain on the northern coast of Muharraq Island. Al Dair village lies to its northwest, while Galali lies to its southeast. It is north of Bahrain International Airport.

Samaheej ( Mashmahig) had a Nestorian Christian presence during its early history, with old foundations of a Nestorian monastery being discovered in the village.

Before the discovery of oil in Bahrain, most of the inhabitants were involved in farming, especially date palms, and fishing.

The name Samahij is from Persian se (three) and mahi (fish) and hence, ‘the three fish’. This name has to do with the geographical form of the area on which this village is situated.

Among the famous people from Samaheej is Abdullah bin Saleh al Samahiji (1675 - 1722), a medieval Islamic scholar, prominent within the Akhbari school of Shiism during the Safavid era.

Education
The Ministry of Education operates government schools. Samajih Primary Intermediate Boys School is the sole government school within Samaheej.

References

External links

 Samaheej Online Website
 Samaheej Tv
 Samaheej Forums
 Samaheej Photo albums
 Samaheej MMS
 Samaheej Club

Populated places in the Muharraq Governorate